Thomas Webel (born 27 July 1954) is a German politician of the Christian Democratic Union of Germany (CDU).

Life and politics 
Webel was born 1954 in Bad Pyrmont and became member of the CDU in 1990.

From 1990 to 2002 Webel was a member of the Landtag of Saxony-Anhalt, the legislative body of the German federal state of Saxony-Anhalt. Webel was chairman of the CDU in Saxony-Anhalt from 2004 to 2018.

Since 2011, Webel has been serving as State Ministry of Regional Development and Transport in the government of Minister-President Reiner Haseloff. As one of the state's representatives at the Bundesrat, he is a member of the Committee on Transport and of the Committee on Urban Development, Housing and Regional Planning. He is also a member of the German-Russian Friendship Group set up by the Bundesrat and the Russian Federation Council.

Other activities 
 Federal Network Agency for Electricity, Gas, Telecommunications, Posts and Railway (BNetzA), Member of the Rail Infrastructure Advisory Council

References

1954 births
Christian Democratic Union of Germany politicians
Ministers of the Saxony-Anhalt State Government
Living people